The sixth season of The Voice Kids, premiered on TV Globo on June 6, 2021 in the  (BRT / AMT) daytime slot. 

Carlinhos Brown returned for his sixth season as coach and was joined by Gaby Amarantos and Michel Teló, who replaced Claudia Leitte and Simone & Simaria.

André Marques left the show in order to host the new season of No Limite and was replaced by Márcio Garcia, while Thalita Rebouças returned for her fifth season as the backstage host.

Teams
 Key

Blind auditions
Key

The Battles
Key

Showdowns

Live shows

Elimination chart
Key

	

Results

Week 1: Quarterfinals

Week 2: Semifinals

Week 3: Finals

Ratings and reception

Brazilian ratings
All numbers are in points and provided by Kantar Ibope Media.

References

External links
The Voice Kids on Gshow.com

Kids 6
2021 Brazilian television seasons